Sir Walter Greaves Greaves-Lord (born Walter Greaves Lord; 21 September 1878 – 18 June 1942) was a British Member of Parliament and judge.

Born in Ince, Lord was educated at Wigan Grammar School, Southport College and University College, Liverpool.  He became a barrister with Gray's Inn, a King's counsel in 1919, a bencher in 1920, and treasurer of the inn in 1933.

Lord changed his surname to "Greaves-Lord" in 1910.  That year, he stood for the Conservative Party in Ince, but was not elected.  He remained involved with the party, and was elected for Norwood at the 1922 United Kingdom general election, serving until February 1935, when he was appointed as a High Court Judge.  He also served as chancellor of the Primrose League in 1926/27.  In 1927, he was knighted.

Greaves-Lord served as a judge until 1940, when he retired.

References

1878 births
1942 deaths
Conservative Party (UK) MPs for English constituencies
People from Ince-in-Makerfield
UK MPs 1922–1923
UK MPs 1923–1924
UK MPs 1924–1929
UK MPs 1929–1931
UK MPs 1931–1935
Knights Bachelor
20th-century King's Counsel
Queen's Bench Division judges
Members of Gray's Inn